The 1983 Fischer-Grand Prix was a men's tennis tournament played on indoor hard courts at the Wiener Stadthalle in Vienna, Austria that was part of the 1983 Volvo Grand Prix. It was the ninth edition if the tournament and was held from 17 October until 23 October 1983. First-seeded Brian Gottfried won the singles title, his fourth at the event after 1977, 1980 and 1982.

Finals

Singles

 Brian Gottfried defeated  Mel Purcell 6–2, 6–3, 7–5
 It was Gottfried's 3rd title of the year and the 78th of his career.

Doubles

 Mel Purcell /  Stan Smith defeated  Marcos Hocevar /  Cássio Motta 6–3, 6–4
 It was Purcell's only title of the year and the 6th of his career. It was Smith's 2nd title of the year and the 89th of his career.

References

External links
 ATP tournament profile
 ITF tournament edition details

 
Fischer-Grand Prix
Vienna Open
Vienna